JETMS is a Lithuanian aviation maintenance and repair company. The company was founded in 2007 and is a part of Avia Solutions Group – a global aerospace business group provides capacity solutions for passenger and cargo airlines worldwide. The Group manages over 100 offices and production facilities worldwide and employs over 10 000 professionals of aviation and other industries and serves more than 2 000 clients across 5 continents.

JETMS is considered as one of the leading players in the MRO (Maintenance, Repair and Operations) market for narrow-body aircraft.



History 
 In 2007 the company was founded under the name of FL Technics Jets.
 In 2013 the company became the first authorized center in Eastern Europe to provide warranty services to Tronair ground handling equipment.
 In 2015 the company became an authorized partner of Rockwell Collins.
 In 2015 the company was renamed to Jet Maintenance Solutions.
 In 2018 the sales of the Avia Solutions Group's Aircraft Maintenance and Repair Business Segment grew 16% to $157.5 million.
 In 2019 Jet Maintenance Solutions became one of the first MROs worldwide to provide 7800 landings inspection for Bombardier CL604.
 In 2021 Jet Maintenance Solutions rebranded to JETMS.
In March 2021, JETMS acquired London based RAS Group consisting of Ras Completions Limited and RAS Interiors Limited.
In 2021, JETMS launched a new line maintenance station located at Nice Côte d’Azur Airport in France. 
In Sep 2021, JETMS receives new Maintenance Organisation Approval Certificate (MOAC) issued by the United Kingdom Civil Aviation Authority (CAA) to conduct base and line MRO services on Embraer EMB135/145 aircraft. 
In March 2022, JETMS' subsidiary Ras Group has rebranded to JETMS Completions. 
in August 2022, JETMS Completions receives FAA approval for Embraer 505 seat maintenance and modification.

Serviced aircraft 
JETMS is EASA Part-145 certified and provides line and base maintenance for the following aircraft types:

 Hawker Beechcraft 700/750/800/800XP/850XP/900XP;
 Bombardier CRJ 100/200/440;
 Bombardier Challenger 604/605/850;
 Bombardier Global 5000/6000
Embraer ERJ135/145
Embraer Legacy 600/650

References

Aircraft maintenance companies